Honda (Hondo) (written: 本田 literally "root ricefield" or "origin ricefield", 本多 lit. "root/origin many" or 誉田 lit. "honor ricefield")  is a Japanese surname.

Notable people with the surname include:

Media, arts, and entertainment

A. Honda, one of the two manga artists under the pen name Akira Himekawa
Chieko Honda (1963–2013), Japanese voice actor
Hiroshi Honda (1910-1970), American painter
Hitomi Honda, member of Japanese girl group AKB48 and South Korean girl group Iz One
Ishirō Honda (1911–1993), Japanese filmmaker
Minako Honda (Minako Kudo), Japanese singer
Takeshi Honda (animator), Director, animator and character designer
Toshiyuki Honda, Japanese jazz musician and composer
Yuka Honda, musician

Science, mathematics, and technology
Kotaro Honda, inventor
Masaji Honda (1897–1984), Japanese botanist (:es:Masaji Honda)
Taira Honda, Japanese mathematician

Sport

Akihiko Honda, Japanese boxing promoter
, Japanese sprint canoeist
, Japanese badminton player
Gene Honda, public address announcer of the Chicago White Sox
Keisuke Honda, football player who plays for Melbourne Victory
Marin Honda, Japanese figure skater
, Japanese footballer
, Japanese swimmer
Takeshi Honda, Japanese figure skater
, Japanese Olympic swimmer
Yuichi Hondo, baseball player
, Japanese footballer

Other

Hiroshi Honda (disambiguation), multiple people
Katsuichi Honda, journalist
 Kei Honda, professional shogi player
Keiji Honda, game developer
Komatsu Honda, Honda Tadakatsu's daughter, adopted daughter of Tokugawa Ieyasu and Sanada Nobuyuki's wife 
Mike Honda, U.S. Congressman (D-CA), 2001–2017
, Japanese shogi player
Soichiro Honda, founder of Honda Motor Company
Tadakatsu Honda (Honda Heihachirō), samurai general from Japanese history

Fictional characters 
E. Honda, character in Street Fighter
Kiku Honda (Japan), one of main characters in Hetalia: Axis Powers
Hayato Honda, a character in Kochira Katsushika-ku Kameari Kōen-mae Hashutsujo
Hiroto Honda (Tristan Taylor), character in the Yu-Gi-Oh! universe
Keiko Honda, character in Crayon Shin-chan
Kyoko Honda and Tohru Honda, characters in Fruits Basket
Mami Honda, character in Gals!
Piston Hondo, formerly known as Piston Honda; a character in the Punch-Out!! series
Sakura Honda, the female version of Kiku Honda from Hetalia: Axis Powers. Appears in season 5.
Shigekuni Honda, central character in The Sea of Fertility quartet by Yukio Mishima
, protagonist of the manga series Magic of Stella

Japanese-language surnames